Jan Schlaudraff (born 18 July 1983) is a German former professional footballer who played as a midfielder and striker. He is the sporting director of Hannover 96.

Club career 
Born in Waldbröl, Schlaudraff started playing professionally for Borussia Mönchengladbach, mainly as a midfielder. During two and a half seasons he managed only ten first division appearances, the first being on 19 February 2003, as he played one minute in a 2–0 home win over VfL Wolfsburg.

Schlaudraff transferred to Alemannia Aachen in January 2005, eventually becoming a striker once more – and being named team captain. In 2005–06's second level, he netted 11 goals to help the side return to the first division after a four-decade hiatus.

Although Schlaudraff performed well in the following campaign, Alemannia dropped a level after just one season, but he caught the eye of league powerhouse Bayern Munich, for a transfer fee of €1.2 million. Competition for him was fierce, with established internationals Miroslav Klose, Luca Toni and Lukas Podolski ahead in the pecking order. Coach Ottmar Hitzfeld chose to use Schlaudraff as a substitute in a few matches, and in most cases as an attacking midfielder.

Schlaudraff's season was a disappointment individually: although Bayern clinched the title, he only managed eight appearances, netting ten goals, but in friendly matches (notably seven against SV Darmstadt 98 in a 5–11 win, and a hat-trick in Bayern's end-of-season Asian tour, against the Indonesian national team 5–1, with youngsters Toni Kroos and Breno also netting). After scoring another two goals against Indian side Mohun Bagan in a 3–0 victory, Schlaudraff's pre-season tally boasted 15 goals in just five games.

In July 2008, he moved to Hannover 96. There he was used exclusively as striker, scoring his first two goals on 14 September 2008, against former team Borussia Mönchengladbach, in a 5–1 home success.

On 18 August 2011, Schlaudraff scored both Hannover goals in their 2–1 victory over Sevilla FC in the Europa League. Hannover went on to win the game 3–2 on aggregate, qualifying for the 2011–12 UEFA Europa League group stage.

In June 2015, he left Hannover after he did not receive an extension of his expiring contract.

International career 
Courtesy of his Alemannia performances, Schlaudraff made his debut for Germany in October 2006 in an international friendly against Georgia in Rostock. Until March 2007 he won two additional caps.

Managerial career
After retiring, Schlaudraff worked as a scout for the agent company SportsTotal. On 3 January 2019, Hannover 96 announced that Schlaudraff had returned to the club and would be working as assistant to the sporting director Gerhard Zuber, beginning with the upcoming 2019–20 season. By April 2019 he had begun his career in management, taking care of the squad planning for the upcoming season.

Career statistics

Honours 
Bayern Munich
 Bundesliga: 2007–08
 DFB-Pokal: 2007–08
 DFL-Ligapokal: 2007

References

External links 
 
 

1983 births
Living people
People from Oberbergischer Kreis
Sportspeople from Cologne (region)
German footballers
Footballers from North Rhine-Westphalia
Association football forwards
Germany international footballers
Germany under-21 international footballers
Bundesliga players
2. Bundesliga players
BFV Hassia Bingen players
Borussia Mönchengladbach players
Alemannia Aachen players
FC Bayern Munich footballers
FC Bayern Munich II players
Hannover 96 players
Hannover 96 II players
Hannover 96 non-playing staff